The 1963 Tampa Spartans football team represented the University of Tampa in the 1963 NCAA College Division football season. It was the Spartans' 27th season. The team was led by head coach Fred Pancoast, in his second year, and played their home games at Phillips Field in Tampa, Florida. They finished with a record of four wins, five losses and one tie (4–5–1). Pancoast resigned as the Spartans' head coach on January 20, 1964, to take the position of ends coach at Florida.

Schedule

References

Tampa
Tampa Spartans football seasons
Tampa Spartans football